Nam Bo-ra (born November 27, 1989) is a South Korean actress. She appeared in Sunny, Moon Embracing the Sun, and Don't Cry, Mommy.

Filmography

Film

Television series

Variety show

Music video

Discography

Ambassadorship 
 Public relations ambassador representing Yellow Umbrella (2023)

Awards and nominations

References

External links 

 
 
 

South Korean film actresses
South Korean television actresses
1989 births
Jellyfish Entertainment artists
Living people
21st-century South Korean actresses
Actresses from Seoul
Dongduk Women's University alumni